Ziad Akram Durrani  (13 February 1982 – 21 June 2012) was a Pakistani politician who had been a member of the Provincial Assembly of North-West Frontier Province from February 2008 to June 2012 from PK-70 (Bannu) and member of the National Assembly of Pakistan from April 2007 to October 2007 from NA-26 (Bannu).

Early life and education
He was born on 13 February 1982 to Akram Khan Durrani.

He graduated from Islamia College Peshawar and had a degree of Bachelor of Arts. He received a degree of Bachelor of Laws from the Law College, University of Peshawar.

Political career
He was elected to the National Assembly of Pakistan as a candidate of Muttahida Majlis-e-Amal (MMA) from Constituency NA-26 (Bannu) in the by-polls held in March 2007.

He was elected to the Provincial Assembly of North-West Frontier Province as a candidate of MMA from Constituency PF-70 (Bannu) in 2008 Pakistani general election.

He died on 21 June 2012 in Peshawar due to Cardiac Arrest.

References

Pashtun people
People from Bannu District
1982 births
2012 deaths
Khyber Pakhtunkhwa MPAs 2008–2013
Pakistani MNAs 2002–2007